Oren Koules (born January 31, 1961) is an American entrepreneur and film producer. He is the co-founder of Evolution Entertainment and produced the Saw film series as well as the CBS television series Two and a Half Men. Koules is also the former owner of the Tampa Bay Lightning and the Helena Bighorns.

Early life 
Koules was born and raised in La Grange Park, Illinois, a suburb of Chicago. As a child, he took figure skating lessons where he developed an interest in playing ice hockey, later dropping out of high school to pursue a career as a professional hockey player.

Career

Early career; hockey and commodities 
Koules competed in the Western Hockey League from 1979 to 1982. During his career he played for six different teams, including the Medicine Hat Tigers, Portland Winter Hawks, Brandon Wheat Kings, and Spokane Flyers. His final year he played for the Hampton Roads Gulls, Virginia Raiders, and Saginaw Gears. His best year was in 1980 with the Spokane Flyers when he scored 28 goals with 45 assists for a total of 73 points.

Koules was not drafted by an NHL team, but he attended two tryout camps for his hometown Chicago Blackhawks. After his hockey career, Koules became a commodities trader at the Chicago Mercantile Exchange in 1983. He was one of the youngest members on the floor and eventually purchased a full membership to the Exchange. He sold his seat and left the exchange in good standing in 1991.

Film career and sports 
Upon arriving in Hollywood, Koules was introduced to former Los Angeles Times reporter, Dale Pollock, and the two formed Peak Productions soon after. Together, they produced films like Mrs. Winterbourne and Set It Off. The early success of Peak Productions led Koules to a job as the Senior Vice President of Production at Paramount Pictures. In 1998, Koules founded Evolution Entertainment along with film producer Mark Burg, with their first major production being the 2002 thriller film John Q starring Denzel Washington. In 2001, Koules became the owner of the Helena Bighorns, a Junior A hockey team, also purchasing the Helena Ice Area.

In 2003, Koules and Mark Burg saw a seven-minute teaser of a film written by Australian screenwriters, Leigh Whannell and James Wan, and agreed to produce the film. The film would later become the original Saw film that was
released in 2004. The budget for the film was $1.2 million with $1 million of the funding coming direct from Koules and Burg. Production was done under a newly formed subsidiary of Evolution Entertainment called Twisted Pictures. The film turned in the Saw franchise with the sequel released in 2005 and the franchise making $420 million at the box office by 2007. Evolution Entertainment was also responsible for the production of Two and a Half Men starting in 2003.

In 2007, Koules started his pursuit to purchase the Tampa Bay Lightning from Palace Sports and Entertainment. In 2008, he agreed to purchase the team through OK Hockey LLC, an investment group he controlled, for $206 million. The group sold the team to Jeffrey Vinik, a minority owner in the Boston Red Sox, for $160 million in 2010.

In June 2011, Koules sold his ownership in Evolution Entertainment, but continued to own and oversee the Saw franchise and Two and a Half Men.

Personal life 

Koules married talent agent Risa Shapiro in 1994. They had one son, Miles, in that same year. Miles Koules is currently a professional ice hockey player, playing for the Cleveland Monsters of the AHL (Columbus Blue Jackets). Koules and Shapiro separated in 2005 and eventually divorced in 2007. In 2008, Koules married Shereen Arazm, a businesswoman and restaurateur. They met by happenstance on a flight from Toronto, where Arazm is originally from, to Los Angeles where Koules was filming Saw II. The pair have two daughters together, Sam and Neve.

Filmography 
He was a producer in all films unless otherwise noted.

Film 

As an actor

Thanks

Television

References

External links 
 
 

1961 births
Living people
Film producers from Illinois
American men's ice hockey left wingers
American people of Greek descent
Atlantic Coast Hockey League players
Brandon Wheat Kings players
Calgary Wranglers (WHL) players
Great Falls Americans players
Ice hockey people from Illinois
Medicine Hat Tigers players
National Hockey League executives
National Hockey League owners
Portland Winterhawks players
Saginaw Gears players
Spokane Flyers players
Ice hockey people from Chicago
Tampa Bay Lightning executives
People from La Grange Park, Illinois